Stipa mexicana is a flowering plant in the family Poaceae, which grows in the poor soil on the top of hillocks to escape competition from other faster growing species.

mexicana
Plants described in 1925